This is a list of the cultures of Slavic Europe.

 East Slavs:
 Belarusian culture
 Russian culture
 Ruthenian culture
 Ukrainian culture
 South Slavs:
 Bosnian culture
 Bulgarian culture
 Croatian culture
 Macedonian culture (Slavic)
 Serbian culture
 Montenegrin culture
 Slovenian culture
 West Slavs:
 Czech culture
 Kashubian culture
 Lusatian culture
 Polabian culture
 Polish culture
 Silesian culture
 Slovak culture
 Sorbian culture

See also
Slavic folklore  
Egg decorating in Slavic culture
 Outline of Slavic history and culture

 
Cultural lists